Melanie Bahlo  is an Australian statistical geneticist and bioinformatician.

Biography
Bahlo’s interest with science and biology developed at a very young age. Growing up in Germany, she used to record the birds that came and visited her bird feeder during winter.  Bahlo attended secondary school at Albury High School in Albury, Australia. She received her PhD in population genetics from Monash University in 1998. Bahlo's research interests include statistics, genetics, bioinformatics, and population genetics. Her work has "led to the discovery of new genes involved in genetic diseases such as deafness and epilepsy". She is a member of the team of scientists affiliated with the Lowy Medical Research Institute (LMRI) studying the genetic basis for macular telangiectasia type 2.  She directed the most recent Genome Wide Association Study (GWAS), which discovered common genetic variants associated with MacTel. 

As of 2009 she is the Laboratory head in the Bioinformatics Division at the Walter and Eliza Hall Institute for Medical Research, where her work has focused on "high throughput sequencing data of human and non-human organisms". 

Bahlo's research projects have included: 
 In-silico gene prioritisation using brain specific gene expression data
 Analysis methods for cell-free DNA for the detection of foetal anomalies and transplant rejection
 Discovery of expanded repeats with whole genome sequencing data
 Identification of identity by descent relationships with DNA data

Bahlo and colleagues (Mark Bennett and Haloom Rafehi) from the Walter and Eliza Hall Institute of Medical Research and their international consortium have contributed to a decades-long global effort that revealed two new gene mutations that cause a rare type of epilepsy.

Awards
2020 Fellow of the Australian Academy of Health and Medical Sciences
2010 Future Fellowship, Australian Research Council
2010 Senior Research Fellowship National Health and Medical Research Council
2009 Moran Medal, Australian Academy of Science
2009–present Craven and Shearer Award, Walter and Eliza Hall Institute

Grants
2014-2018 Program Grant “Computational and statistical bioinformatics for medical ‘omics’”, National Health and Medical Research Council
2008-2012 Program Grant “Genetic and Bioinformatic Analysis of Complex Human Diseases”, National Health and Medical Research Council

Service to the community
2014 Panel Member, Marsden Fund New Zealand
2014 Australian and New Zealand Association for the Advancement of Science Lecture: “Using statistics to find the causes of inherited diseases”
2014 Invited attendee “Translation of Omics-Based Discoveries into Clinical Research and Practice”, Workshop, National Health and Medical Research Council
2014 Gene Technology Access Centre Afternoon Tea with Victorian Teachers
2014 Gene Technology Access Centre Year 9 Students “Meet the scientists”

Memberships
 Human Genetics Society of Australia
 American Society for Human Genetics 
 Statistical Society of Australia
 International Statistics Institute
 Royal Statistical Society

References

Living people
Australian women scientists
Wikibomb2016
Year of birth missing (living people)
Fellows of the Australian Academy of Health and Medical Sciences
Monash University alumni